The dwarf spotted wobbegong (Orectolobus parvimaculatus) is a carpet shark in the family Orectolobidae, described in 2008.

See also

 List of sharks

References

dwarf spotted wobbegong
Marine fish of Western Australia
Taxa named by Peter R. Last
Taxa named by Justin A. Chidlow 
dwarf spotted wobbegong